Sabercat is a common name for a subfamily of extinct saber-toothed predators.

There are several sports teams named Sabercats, SaberCats  or Sabrecats, including:
 Houston SaberCats, a Major League Rugby team
 Rayside-Balfour Sabrecats, a former junior league ice hockey team
 San Jose SaberCats, a former Arena Football League team
 Tacoma Sabercats, a former minor league ice hockey team
 Fossil Ridge High School's mascot
 Maranatha Baptist University's athletic team

See also
 Sabretooth (disambiguation)